Branko Milisavljević (born 21 July 1976) is a Serbian professional basketball coach and former player who is an assistant coach for Podgorica of the Prva A Liga and the ABA League Second Division.

Playing career 
During his playing career, Milisavljević played abroad in several countries, most notably in France and Greece where he played for three clubs. He also played in Russia, Germany, Israel, Lithuania, Spain and Switzerland. In his homeland, Milisavljević played for Borac Čačak, Partizan, Mega Vizura and BKK Radnički.

Coaching career 
Milisavljević coached Radnički Belgrade and BBC Monthey. In January 2019, he was named as the head youth coach of Mega Bemax succeeding Vlada Vukoičić. 

On June 7 2019, Milisavljević became the head coach for OKK Beograd of the Basketball League of Serbia. He left the club after the 2019–20 season. 

In June 2021, Montenegrin team Podgorica named him their new assistant coach.

References

External links
 Branko Milisavljević at acb.com
 Branko Milisavljević at lnb.fr
 Player Profile at eurobasket.com
 Branko Milisavljević at euroleague.net
 Coach Profile at eurobasket.com

1976 births
Living people
Basketball League of Serbia players
BC Dynamo Moscow players
BC Rytas players
Real Betis Baloncesto players
Ironi Nahariya players
KK Borac Čačak players
KK Mega Basket players
KK Partizan players
Liga ACB players
Lions de Genève players
Lugano Tigers players
Limoges CSP players
Maroussi B.C. players
Olympiacos B.C. players
OKK Beograd coaches
P.A.O.K. BC players
Metropolitans 92 players
Point guards
BKK Radnički coaches
BKK Radnički players
Serbian expatriate basketball people in France
Serbian expatriate basketball people in Germany
Serbian expatriate basketball people in Greece
Serbian expatriate basketball people in Israel
Serbian expatriate basketball people in Lithuania
Serbian expatriate basketball people in Montenegro
Serbian expatriate basketball people in Russia
Serbian expatriate basketball people in Spain
Serbian expatriate basketball people in Switzerland
Serbian men's basketball coaches
Serbian men's basketball players
SLUC Nancy Basket players
Sportspeople from Užice
Telekom Baskets Bonn players